Ayris is an English surname. Notable people with this name include:

 Cyril Ayris, Australian author
 Johnny Ayris (born 1953), English former football right winger
 Renae Ayris (born 1990), Australian dancer, model, and beauty pageant contestant

English-language surnames